More is an EP by Canadian artist Michael Bublé, released in the United States on June 26, 2005. The EP was made available as a digital download, and was available exclusively on CD via Best Buy stores. The EP includes six unreleased tracks, including two live tracks, plus four tracks only included on the fan club edition of Buble's second studio album, It's Time (2005).

Track listing

Release history

References

2005 EPs
Michael Bublé albums
Reprise Records EPs